Riverfield Country Day School (RCDS) is a private school based in Tulsa, Oklahoma, United States.

Riverfield Country Day School was founded in 1984 by a group of parents and teachers working with Marty and Tom Clark.  This group's motivation was to provide an enhanced opportunity for educational growth and personal development for their children, with an emphasis on the whole child.

The school opened in August 1984 in a remodeled post office, with 40 children from three months old to second grade. The long-range plan included a country campus with outdoor learning. However, when enrollment more than doubled in five months, plans were accelerated to move "to the country," across the Arkansas River in a field, thus the name Riverfield Country Day School.

In 1991, Riverfield relocated to the first wing on its current campus. The following year, an additional wing with a library and music room was added to serve the growing demand for elementary grades. The Middle School opened in August 1994, bringing the total facility to more than 40,500 square feet serving more than 400 students. Two donations of property from grandparent and former Board member Steve Jatras and a school-funded purchase brought the total acreage to 90.

Riverfield began a new era in August 2002, with the addition of a freshman class. The school embarked on the "Spreading Our Wings" capital campaign in order to build facilities to accommodate the growing student body. The campaign was successful, thanks in large part to the generosity of Tulsa philanthropist Genave Rogers. On Visiting Day in November 2004, the Clark Gymnasium and Genave Rogers Upper School were dedicated with the help of Dr. Jane Goodall who joined us to dedicate the Science Lab in memory of Tim O’Halloran, the first Upper School Head.

In August 2006, Ms. Rogers made another private donation for the purchase of an additional 30 acres to the northwest of the current property. This brought the campus to 120 total acres. The Langerak Academic Center was added in the spring of 2008, the Martha S. Clark Field was dedicated in the fall of 2010 and four tennis courts hosted their first matches in the spring of 2011.

During the 2011-12 school year, administrators, faculty, Board members, students, parents, and alumni worked together on a Strategic Plan that will chart Riverfield's course for 2012-17.  Focus areas of the Strategic Plan are culture; programming; school community; faculty, administration, and staff; physical plant and facilities; and finance and development. A new Upper and Middle School building was recently completed (as of the 2013-14 school year), complete with a computer lab with a green-screen, a cafeteria, three science labs, as well as classrooms for foreign languages, English, math, and history.

To the disappointment of many in the Riverfield community, the school's tackle football team participated in its last season during the 2012-13 school year. However, the decision to discontinue the program was seen as inevitable due to the high amount of injuries sustained and lack of interest by students. Since 2014, there have been multiple requests by some students to have the program return, but have failed in their attempts and have received two seasons of flag football instead. The first season in 2016 spanned two games, both of which against Cornerstone Christian, and were both shutouts for the Ravens. The second season unfortunately had the games cancelled, the end of a short football return to RCDS.

RCDS has what is regarded by many to be the best school music program in the country, known as "Riverfield Rocks." RCDS also has a summer camp called "Camp Raven" which spans 12 weeks in the summer, and includes a variety of different camps within which have their own themes.

The 120-acre campus also features a football field, four tennis courts, and numerous hiking trails.

Independent Schools Association of the Southwest
Private schools in Oklahoma
Schools in Tulsa, Oklahoma